Eric LeMarque (born July 1, 1969) is an American-French author and a former professional ice hockey player. During his ice hockey career, he was a member of the French national ice hockey team and competed with the team at the 1994 Winter Olympics.

Early life
LeMarque was born in Paris, France but grew up in the West Hills and Pacific Palisades, two neighborhoods of Los Angeles.

Hockey career
Growing up in the United States, he played Division I college ice hockey with the Northern Michigan University Wildcats from 1987 to 1991. He was drafted by the Boston Bruins of the NHL at 17-years old with the 224th pick in the 1987 draft. He played the majority of his career in France, where he won three straight national championships from 1994 to 1996, and in Germany. He was selected to the French national ice hockey team and competed with the team at the 1994 Winter Olympics in Lillehammer, Norway, where he netted one goal in five games, and at the IHW World Championships in 1994 and 1995. He retired from hockey during the 1999–2000 season and took up snowboarding focusing on the X-Games.

Later life
On February 6, 2004, LeMarque became trapped in the Sierra Nevada Mountains wilderness. He survived for eight days by living in a makeshift igloo and eating pine nuts and cedar. He was able to find his way back to Mammoth Mountain Ski Area after eight days and almost 10 miles of hiking through deep snow and sub-freezing temperatures. Despite the best efforts of medical professionals, he lost both of his legs due to severe frostbite.

In 2017, the movie 6 Below: Miracle on the Mountain was released based on the book Crystal Clear by LeMarque.

References

External links 
 Biography
 
 Olympic statistics at hockey-reference.com

Living people
American men's ice hockey players
Boston Bruins draft picks
Ice hockey players at the 1994 Winter Olympics
Northern Michigan Wildcats men's ice hockey players
Olympic ice hockey players of France
Ice hockey people from Los Angeles
Greensboro Monarchs players
Arkansas Glaciercats players
1969 births